Albufeira is a city and seat of its own municipality in the district of Faro, in the southernmost Portuguese region of Algarve. The city proper had a population of 28,645 in 2021. A tourist destination (due to its coastal conditions), Albufeira expands to approximately 300,000 residents during the summer and during the Christmas and New Year celebrations, owing to the number of hotels and lodgings in its municipality, that includes marina facilities, golf courses, restaurants and bars for the annual flood of visitors.

History

It is unclear when the first settlements specifically formed in the region of Albufeira, although scientific research suggests origins during the pre-historic epoch, and that the town of Albufeira formed as an out-port of the maritime fishery. The primitive settlement was occupied by the Romans, who named it Baltum, introducing a centralized administrative structure and developing intense agricultural activities along with commerce. The Romans constructed aqueducts, roads and bridges, of which parts still remain.

After the fall of the Roman Empire, the region was ruled by Germanic peoples like the Visigoths. In the early 8th century, it was conquered by invading Muslims from northern Africa. The modern name originated from the Arabic word al-Buħayra (البحيرة), for the lagoon, in reference to the lagoon that formed in the lowlands. The Moors constructed strong defensive structures, making the area almost impregnable, allowing this area to remain in the hands of their forces longer than other possessions in Portugal. The development of agriculture during this period was notable, with the introduction of new techniques and plant species. The Moors used the plow and fertilizers, as well as winches for lifting the water from the wells, introducing the irrigation of fields, constructing dams and transforming uncultivated areas into gardens and orchards.

Middle Ages
The Christian conquest of the region began at the end of the 12th century. When Afonso III of Portugal occupied the throne, most of the Algarve had already fallen into the hands of the Christians. Templar and Hospitaller Knights, military and religious orders that supported the Reconquista, assaulted many of the lands occupied by the Arabs, but were never successful in taking Albufeira. It was following the capture of Faro that the siege of Albufeira became unsupportable. Encircled by enemy forces on all sides, it fell in 1249 to the forces of Afonso III, who donated the lands to the Order of Aviz in 1250. The Moors were persecuted terribly by the victorious army, which chased the remaining forces into a cavern, known today as Cova do Xorino, situated near the southern limits of the old city. The town became part of the kingdom of Portugal and the Algarves. King D. Manuel I awarded a Charter (foral) to the Town of Albufeira on 20 August 1504 and from that day the town was governed according to the legislation in force for the rest of the country.

18th and 19th centuries

Albufeira was one of the towns of the Algarve most affected by natural calamities, but it was the 1755 Lisbon earthquake which caused the worst damage. The sea invaded the town with  waves, destroying almost all the buildings along the coast. In the town proper, only 27 residential buildings survived the natural disaster, but in states of ruin. The parochial church, an old mosque adapted by the Christians, where many of the residents sought refuge during the cataclysm, collapsed causing 227 deaths. Even following these events, the Algarve continued to experience aftershocks, until 20 August of the following year, which hindered the reconstruction under the Bishop D. Francisco Gomes de Avelar.

In 1833, during the Liberal Wars between absolutist and liberal forces, Albufeira was encircled and attacked by Remexido's soldiers: an anti-liberal, absolutist leader who was as popular as feared and damaged the village's buildings, having executed many of its inhabitants as well. After the 19th century, the community grew through the expansion of the fishery. This is why the locals annually celebrate 'Festival de Peixes', which has been tradition and serves to honor the fisheries in Albufeira that helped with the growth of the city.

20th century
In the first decades of the 20th century, the export of fish and nuts represented the largest contribution to the local economy of the municipality. The town itself had five factories employing 700-800 people, mostly wives of fishermen working in local production. Yet, between 1930 and 1960, there was a considerable decline in fortunes, resulting in the closing of many of these factories, the reduction in fishing boats along the coast and the abandonment of many of the homes. The population was reduced by half and the fishing industry became a subsistence activity, supporting local consumption only.

The town started to become a hub for tourism in the 1960s, and has grown to accommodate this since, growing out into the surrounding hills to accommodate thousands of the 5 million tourists who visit the Algarve region each year.

Geography

Since 2013, Albufeira is divided into four freguesias (civil parishes):
Albufeira e Olhos de Água
Ferreiras
Guia
Paderne

Destinations from Albufeira

International relations

Albufeira is twinned with:

 Dunfermline, Fife, United Kingdom (since May 1995)

Climate

Economy
Tourism and commerce are the main activities in Albufeira. Most tourists arrive via Faro Airport.

Tourism

The tourist areas are divided into two main areas, Areias de São João, known colloquially as The Strip, and the Old Town. The Strip's main street is Avenida Francisco Sá Carneiro which is full of bars, restaurants and open-air discothèques.

Architecture

The architecture of the region is an eclectic mix of typical Portuguese Algarvean pale white and tiled residential homes, along narrow streets, intermixed with modern tourist developments. This can be seen in the design of many buildings in the area. In addition, the municipality is dotted with rich historical and architectural landmarks, such as the following:

Civic

 Albufeira-Ferreiras Railway Station, the iconic station was originally identified in 1918 pamphlet, as part of the Terreiro do Paço-Barreiro route. After November 1926, faster locomotives began to serve this line, while in 1938, the Empresa  de Viação do Algarve began regular service between Albufeira and Ferreiras.
 Bridge of Paderne
 Cine-Theatre of Albufeira
 Electrical Station of Albufeira
 Fiscal Guard Post of Albufeira
 Fountain of Paderne
 Judicial Courthouse of Albufeira
 Lighthouse of Albufeira
 Hospital of the Santa Casa da Misericórdia of Albufeira
 Hotel of Balaia
 Municipal Palace/Hall of Albufeira
 Postal, Telegraph & Telephones (CTT) of Albufeira
 Residence of Paderne
 Tower Clock, situated on Rua Bernardino de Sousa, it is considered by the city of Albufeira as its ex-libris; constructed in the 19th century, it consists of a tower with a crown of iron, representing a belfry tower, with its solitary bell hung from its structure. It is a functioning belltower and illuminated normally during feast days and religious celebrations.
 Watermill of Paderne

Military

 Battery of Albufeira
 Castle of Albufeira
 Castle of Paderne, came to be situated on the remnants of an ancient Calcolthic, or even Neolithic, settlement, that was adapted by the Romans as an outpost overlooking the roads between settlements. Following the 713 capture of the emplacement, the Almohads built the Castle to enforce their occupation, in a series fortifications that included Silves, Loulé and Faro.
 Tower of Guia
 Tower of Medronheira, constructed during the reign of King John III of Portugal, this lookout served to announce the approach of ships and/or attacks by pirates or privateers.

Religious

 Church of Nossa Senhora da Conceição, situated on Rua da Igreja Nova it dates from the 18th century (1782) and was consecrated on 15 July 1800 by the Bishop of the Algarve (then D. Francisco Gomes de Avelar), to replace the old parochial church destroyed in 1755. The destroyed church building was a converted former mosque. The Neoclassic church, consisting of single nave, four lateral chapels, baptismal chapel, choir, two pulpits and lateral halls, is dedicated to Bishop São Luís, Our Lady of Fátima and the Sacred Heart of Jesus. Highlighting this temple is a painting by Albufeirense Samora Barros that emblazons the altar, and serves as the base for the image of Our Lady of the Conception, patron saint of Albufeira. Above the principal triumphal arch is the Cross of Aviz, from the religious-military order, that Albufeira was associated with at the foundation of Portugal.
 Church of Nossa Senhora da Guia, commonly referred as the Church of Our Lady of the Guide or Our Lady of the Visitation, the parochial church of Guia is a 17th-century building, noted for an 18th-century image of Our Lady of the Visitation, Saint Anthony of Padua, and Crucified Christ, from the same period, in addition to images of Nossa Senhora do Rosário (Our Lady of the Rosary) and Nossa Senhora das Dores (Our Lady of Sorrows), from the 18th century, in addition to azulejo tile that fills the footers of the body of the church.
 Church of Nossa Senhora da Visitação
 Church of Santa Ana
 Church of São Sebastião
 Church of São Sebastião da Guia
 Church of Senhora da Esperança
 Hermitage of Nossa Senhora da Guia, dating from the 16th century, this structure was damaged by the earthquake of 1755, rebuilt in the first quarter of the 18th century, when the gilded retable was installed. An important work of the Baroque in the Algarve, it has a simple interior with polychromatic azulejo tile and image of the patron saint dating from the 17th century.
 Hermitage of Nossa Senhora do Pé da Cruz
 Hermitage of Nossa Senhora da Orada
 Hermitage of São Sebastião, built around the 16th century, or early 17th century, it was greatly damaged by the 1755 earthquake, yet was completely restored in three months time. Dedicated to Saint Sebastian (since he was the legendary saint responsible for the disappearance of the Black Plague), a 17th-century, wood image of the saint (which was initially housed in this hermitage) is located in the sacristy of the parochial church of Guia.

Culture

A local culinary specialty is a rich steamed stew dish of local shellfish, traditionally referred to as Cataplana (named for the cookware used in its preparation), which is a well-known dish from the Algarve. Similarly, the Caldeirada (or fish stew) and the simple grilled sardines, are also popular examples of the traditional dishes, typical of Portugal's coastal areas.

Sport
The local football team is Imortal DC. 
Several regular football tournaments are played in the Algarve, notably the Algarve Cup. Also, many British teams spend the summer in Albufeira for pre-season training sessions, participating in friendly games, including Sunderland, Ipswich Town, Aston Villa, Fulham, Sheffield Wednesday, Oxford United and Brentford.

The city plays host to the Almond Blossom Cross Country competition annually. Established in 1977, the event attracts international-calibre runners, boosting this sport and tourism to the area.

Politics
The municipality of Albufeira is governed by the Câmara municipal of Albufeira. During the 2021 municipal election, sitting mayor José Carlos Rolo (PPD/PSD) has been reinstated with 32,04% of the votes.

Notable people 
Bonnie Tyler (born 1951) a Welsh singer with a husky voice, has lived in Albufeira since 1988.
Daniel Gonçalves (born 1982) a football coach and assistant manager of Primeira Liga side Boavista
Filipa Sousa (born 1985) a singer who represented Portugal at the Eurovision Song Contest 2012

References

External links

Municipality official website

 
Cities in Portugal
Populated places in Faro District
Towns of the Algarve
Marinas in Portugal
Municipalities of the Algarve
Seaside resorts in Portugal
Municipalities of Faro District